Robert Stafford was an American politician.

Robert Stafford may also refer to:

Robert Stafford (MP) (fl. 1378–1383), MP for Staffordshire
Robert de Stafford (c. 1036–1088), Norman nobleman
Rob Stafford (born 1958), Chicago television anchor
Robert Stafford (film editor) (1910–2003), worked on Escape to Witch Mountain
 Robert Stafford (fl. 1417-1429), a Sussex chaplain who had assumed the alias of Frere Tuck

See also

 Stafford (surname)
 
 Robert (disambiguation)
 Stafford (disambiguation)